Selura is a lake in the municipality of Flekkefjord in Agder county, Norway.

Location 
The lake lies immediately northeast of the town of Flekkefjord

Selurafossen, the waterfall at the outflow of Lake Selura, historically provided a source of power for some industries, including a barrel factory and tannery in Flekkefjord.

See also
List of lakes in Norway

References

Flekkefjord
Lakes of Agder